Dualla may refer to:

Dualla, County Tipperary
Dualla, Ivory Coast
The Duala people of Cameroon
The Duala language spoken by that people
Douala, a city in Cameroon
Anastasia Dualla, a character from the Battlestar Galactica television series